Jar is a district in the municipality of Bærum, Norway. Its population (2007) is 4,868.

It is served by the Jar rail station on the Kolsås Line.

References

Villages in Akershus
Bærum